Spruce Center is an unincorporated community in Douglas County, in the U.S. state of Minnesota.

Spruce Center was so named from its location within Spruce Hill Township.

References

Unincorporated communities in Douglas County, Minnesota
Unincorporated communities in Minnesota